François Audet is a Canadian academician dedicated himself in humanitarian aid in which he worked for 15 years before starting an academic career.

He is the founder and director of the Canadian Observatory on Crises and Humanitarian Action (OCCAH)  Attached to the School of Management Sciences (ESG) at the Université du Québec à Montréal since 2012.

François Audet obtained a doctorate from École nationale d'administration publique (National School of Public Administration). He regularly works with the media to analyze and discuss disasters and contemporary humanitarian issues.

Pablications 
In addition to many articles, François Audet has published the following books:

 *Mobilités internationales et intervention interculturelle - International mobility and intercultural intervention Theories, experiences and practices, under the direction of Catherine Montgomery and Caterine Bourassa-Dansereau Presses of the University of Quebec, 2017 
 L’Aide canadienne au développement- Canadian Development Assistance•: Balance Sheet and Perspective (edited by M. E. Desrosiers and S. Roussel, University of Montreal Press, 2008, 352 p. 5
 Nouvelles d’humanitaires-Humanitarian News, Les Malins Publishing, 2016, 264 p. 6 (
 Comprendre les organisations humanitaires- Understanding humanitarian organizations, University of Quebec Press, 276 p. 7

Achievements 
 Development of the program "Risk Management and Security in new contexts of insecurity" to Québec international cooperation organizations, in partnership with AQOCI and with the support of the Ministère des Relations internationales and La Francophonie.
 Visiting scholar for the Harvard University Program on Humanitarian Policy and Conflict Research (HPCR)
 Co-founder of the Canadian Humanitarian Partnership Conference in partnership with the Humanitarian Coalition and the International Development Research Center (IDRC), October 2013 and December 2014.

References

Rimouski
Université du Québec à Montréal
Academics
Universities and colleges in Quebec
Montreal
Year of birth missing (living people)
Living people